HP Jetdirect is the name of a technology sold by Hewlett-Packard that allows computer printers to be directly attached to a Local Area Network.  The "Jetdirect" designation covers a range of models from the external 1 and 3 port parallel print servers known as the 300x and 500x, to the internal EIO print servers for use with HP printers. The Jetdirect series also includes wireless print server (Bluetooth, 802.11b and g) models, as well as gigabit Ethernet and IPv6-compliant internal cards.

History

HP Jetdirect was first introduced in March 1991 (code named QuickSilver) with the LaserJet IIIsi network printer (code named Eli).  Jetdirect is based on HP's MIO (Modular Input/Output) interface, which was designed from the ground up with the IIIsi to create a mainstream full function high performance networked printer.  The initial MIO interface card had Ethernet and Token Ring physical layer variants and used various networking protocols over an AUI/BNC connection. Initially, a printer needed a separate card for each protocol, such as TCP/IP, IPX/SPX, AppleTalk, or DLC/LLC.  The following year the team applied the technology to the legacy accessory slot on the LaserJetIIs and IIIs XIO (Extended Input/Output). MIO type Jetdirect cards were also used for network connectivity on some HP/Agilent laboratory equipment such as the 6890A and 6890 Plus series of gas chromatographs. These included unusual network connection types such as HPs I-Net which was used as an interconnect between various pieces of hardware that controlled the 58xx and 68xx series gas chromatographs. Not until 1994 would MIO interface cards be released that could support more than one protocol per card.

The next development releases added connection interfaces.  In 1992, a card with both 8P8C modular telephone and BNC connectors for Ethernet was released, and in 1993, the first external Jetdirects were introduced with a parallel interface.  This enabled Jetdirect cards to connect to almost any printer, making that printer network-capable.  In 1995, the Ex plus 3 was released, with 3 parallel ports on one network interface, allowing 3 printers to share 1 network address.

1997 saw the new numbering format for both internal and external Jetdirect servers. Internals began the 6xx series with the release of the 600n, multi-protocol card that supported TCP/IP, IPX/SPX, DLC/LLC, and AppleTalk over a Token Ring network; along with the 1760x series external print server - also multi-protocol.  An Ethernet version of the 600n was released in 1998.  In 1999, the Jetdirect autoswitch was introduced.

1998 also saw the release of 170x, the first value-line print server aimed at smaller companies that did not necessarily need full networking - only TCP/IP or IPX/SPX support.  This was followed in 2000 by the Jetdirect 70x home print server.

Protocols

More advanced versions of JetDirect supported a number of network printing protocols. However, the protocol that ended up being associated with it, the JetDirect protocol, is its raw TCP/IP protocol sometimes referred to as Socket API or RAW. It is an extremely simple network printing protocol. Submitting a print job can be done by netcating a file containing the page description language (e.g. PostScript, PCL) to the appropriate TCP port on the printer (default port is 9100). Information about the printer and job is simply sent to the client while the TCP connection is active. The port would reject connections if printer is busy.

AppSocket is a very similar implementation by Tektronix for Phaser printers, later sold to Xerox. This protocol adds support for querying for printer status by non-printing users via a separate UDP port.

Most JetDirect devices also came with, JetDirect Interface, a telnet interface for configuring the device or printer.

External print servers

Internal print servers

MIO

MIO (Modular Input/Output) was the first technology developed by HP for its laser printers to enable the addition of peripheral cards such as Jetdirect.

LIO

LIO (Low-end I/O) interfaces were developed by HP as a corporate response to the strictly internal MIO and EIO development path. The LIO interface differs from MIO/EIO in that the card is wrapped in an external plastic casing and is hot-swappable. The LIO backplane technology is based on a low power/low-voltage (< 1-volt) differential signaling technology.

 200N (C6502a) - Parallel with Centronics Interface
 200m (J6039C) – 10/100 BASE-T (Supports only Windows and Apple Mac, fixed firmware)
 250m (J6042B) – 10/100 BASE-T (Full support for Netware and Unix, firmware upgradeable)
 280m (J6044A) – 802.11b Wireless

EIO

EIO (Enhanced Input/Output) is a modular interface developed by HP for its printers to expand their capabilities. EIO does not just serve Jetdirect cards, but EIO hard drives and the EIO Connectivity card for adding communication ports to the printers as well. EIO utilizes the 3.3V signaling technology of the Conventional PCI bus and is significantly more energy-efficient than MIO technology. EIO print servers will not work in LIO slots, nor will the LIO print servers work in EIO slots.

 1284B Parallel Card (J7972G) - Provides one Type C Mini-Centronics 36-pin parallel port.
 600n – 10/100BASE-TX/10BASE2/LocalTalk (J3110A, J3111A, J3112A, J3113A) (Discontinued)
 610n – Ethernet/Fast Ethernet/802.5, DE9, RJ45 (J4169A, J4167A) (Discontinued)
 615n – Ethernet/Fast Ethernet (10/100BASE-TX, 802.3) (J6057A) (Discontinued)
 620n – Ethernet/Fast Ethernet (10/100BASE-TX, 802.3) (J7934A, J7934G)
 625n – Ethernet/Fast Ethernet/Gigabit (10/100/1000BASE-TX, 802.3) (J7960A, J7960G) (Discontinued)
 630n – Ethernet/Fast Etnernet/Gigabit (10/100/1000BASE-Tx, 802.3) IPv6 (J7997G) replacement for 625n (Discontinued)
 635n – Ethernet/Fast Ethernet/Gigabit (10/100/1000BASE-TX, 802.3) IPv6/IPsec (J7961A, J7961G) (Discontinued)
 640n - Ethernet/Fast Ethernet/Gigabit (10/100/1000BASE-TX, 802.3) IPv6/IPsec (J8025A) 
 680n – 802.11b Wireless (Discontinued)
 690n – Ethernet/Fast Ethernet/Wireless  (10/100BASE-TX, 802.3, 802.11b/g) IPv6/IPsec (J8007G) (Discontinued)
 695nw - Ethernet/Fast Ethernet/Gigabit/Wireless  (10/100/1000BASE-TX, 802.3, 802.11b/g/n) IPv6/IPsec (J8024A)

615n series ASIC issue
In 2002 HP released the 615n series of Internal EIO print server. This model featured a new chipset manufactured in Singapore that had a problem related to either overheating or data overload. Otherwise known as the ASIC issue, this meant the 615n card could fail without warning, and when it failed, would completely shut down, appearing to vanish from the printer entirely.

Soon afterwards, HP began to do a per-item replacement policy that has ended as of October 31, 2008, when all known 615n cards were at least 4 years old and at such time HP felt it had taken appropriate corporate responsibility for a defect in manufacturing.

The 615n cards most often affected were the units installed in the Laserjet 2300, 4200 and Color 4600 series. Those cards appear to be most prone to failure.

Any 615n series card can fail, but it is up to HP to determine if the failure is due to the chipset or some other factor. HP recommended to call them or contact them through the Web site and they will proceed to do some simple troubleshooting steps to determine if the failure is due to the chipset or some other cause. If it is proven to be the chipset, HP would be able to replace the card under warranty with an as-new card (nominally a 620n).

Other Jetdirect products

bt1300

The BT1300 is a Bluetooth compliant network adapter for network-ready parallel or USB printers. (Discontinued)
 2MB flash memory for software and print server upgrades

Print Server Appliance 4250

The Print Server Appliance 4250 is perhaps the most ambitious of the Jetdirect products - being a complete printing facility in a box. The system comes ready to go with a pre-loaded and configured Print Server running on a Linux core with an Apache Web Server. Once connected to the network, the device is able to manage up to 50 print shares with any supported network-ready printer, not just HP products. (Discontinued)
 128MB onboard memory
 20GB onboard HDD with 7GB available for print spool operations
 Supports up to 50 individual print queues or printer installs
 Allows up to 350 simultaneous client connections for enterprise printing
 Allows for updating and loading of print drivers from any source through an on-board web browser interface
 Supports both TCP/IP connections and LPD connections (LPD for printing only) for communication to virtually any network-compliant printer

EIO connectivity card

The Jetdirect EIO connectivity card allows for the expansion of any EIO printer to gain a USB 1.0, Serial, and Localtalk interface. This card has all three interface connectors and on-board electronics to give the printer the ability to use these interfaces. (Discontinued)

References

External links
 List of current HP Jetdirect models
 HP Jetdirect Print Servers - Firmware update information
 HP Firmware collection for JetDirect models

Computer printing
Hewlett-Packard
Printing protocols